Arctesthes titanica is a moth of the family Geometridae first described by Brian H. Patrick, Hamish J. H. Patrick and Robert J. B. Hoare in 2019. It is endemic to New Zealand. The species was named after the Titans of Greek mythology and recognizing the ship Titanic and the film of the same name.

References

Moths of New Zealand
Larentiinae
Moths described in 2019
Endemic fauna of New Zealand
Endemic moths of New Zealand